Miyara River (Japanese:宮良川) is the biggest natural fresh water river of Ishigaki Island located in Okinawa Prefecture of Japan. The river is popular for the mangroves forest in its both banks which houses various wild birds and butterflies.

References

Rivers of Japan